Thomas Talmage may refer to:
 Thomas De Witt Talmage, American preacher, clergyman and divine
 Thomas G. Talmage, mayor of Brooklyn